Barry Wilson (born May 12, 1943) is a former American football player and coach.  He served as the head coach at Duke University from 1990 to 1993.

Wilson served as a defensive assistant under Steve Spurrier with the United States Football League's Tampa Bay Bandits and at Duke, and was promoted to head coach after Spurrier left for Florida shortly after leading the Blue Devils to a share of the Atlantic Coast Conference title. Wilson was unable to maintain the modest success Duke had enjoyed under Spurrier. A year after winning a share of the conference title, Wilson's first team crumbled to a 4-7 record and won just one game in ACC play. He compiled a record of 13–30–1 in four years, winning just four games in ACC play.

Head coaching record

References

1943 births
Living people
Duke Blue Devils football coaches
Florida Gators football coaches
Georgia Bulldogs football coaches
Georgia Bulldogs football players
Georgia Tech Yellow Jackets football coaches
Ole Miss Rebels football coaches
United States Football League coaches
Players of American football from Savannah, Georgia